Dasypterus is a genus of  or subgenus of vesper bat. As a genus, it includes species that were formerly in the genus Lasiurus. Collectively, members of Dasypterus are referred to as the yellow bats.

Taxonomy

Based on genetic divergence within Lasiurus, Baird et al. recommended that the hoary bats be recognized as a separate genus, Aeorestes. They additionally recommended that Dasypterus should be elevated from a subgenus to a genus as well. However, as Lasiurus was previously monophyletic, some authors see the creation of two new genera—Aeorestes and Dasypterus—as a solution to something that was not a problem. Teta advocated using Aeorestes as a subgenus and retaining the usage of Dasypterus as such.

In a 2017 follow-up to their 2015 study, Baird et al. again expressed that Aeorestes, Dasypterus, and Lasiurus should be separate genera comprising the tribe Lasiurini. They stated that the genetic distance of the three genera was much greater than observed between other bat genera, on average. In contrast to the average of  12.0% inter-generic divergence reported from another study on bats, Aeorestes and Dasypterus varied 18.79%; Aeorestes and Lasiurus varied 19.05%; and Dasypterus and Lasiurus varied 19.79%.

Species
The genus consists of the following four species:

 Southern yellow bat (Dasypterus ega)
 Cuban yellow bat (Dasypterus insularis)
 Northern yellow bat (Dasypterus intermedius)
 Western yellow bat (Dasypterus xanthinus)

References

External links
 

Bat genera
Lasiurini
Taxa named by Wilhelm Peters